Sindhi Adabi Board is a government sponsored institution in Pakistan for the promotion of Sindhi literature. It was established in 1955 in Jamshoro, Sindh. It is under the Education Department of the Government of Sindh.

Activities
The organization has published Sindhi folklore, poetry, lexicography, archaeology and original literary works. These works have included anthologies of poetry works of Shah Abdul Latif Bhittai, Sachal Sarmast, Chen Rai Sami, Khalifo Nabi Bux Laghari, Miyoon Shah Inayat, Hamal Khan Laghari, Talib-ul-Mola and other mystic poets of Sindh.

The Board has published translations of selected works, manuscripts and other writings from world literature into the Sindhi language.

Background
Sindhi literature has been in existence for around five thousand years, through the civilizations of Moen-jo-Daro, Amri and Bhambhore. The Vedic texts  were written by the banks of Sindhu (the River Indus) in Pakistan.

Literary relics in British museums today show Buddhist influences over early literary works. With the advent of Arabs, Sindh received the cultural impact of Islam, and the first complete translation of the Qur'an was completed in 884 CE in Sindh. The Soomra Dynasty (1026 to 1351 CE) was a period of renaissance of the Sindh language in literature. Religious verse also took life in this period; Pir Sadaruddin was a pioneer of verse who invented Ginan as a new genre in Sindhi literature. The Sama period is known as the golden age of Sindhi verse. Qazi Kadan, Shaikh Hamad, Ishaq Aahangar and Mamooi Fakirs were the leading poets of this period.

The times of the Arghons, the Trakhans and the Mughal Empire (1526 to 1858) gave rise to nationalistic feelings in Sindhi literature. The verse of Makhdoom Nooh Sarwar, Lutfullah Kadri, and Shah Inayat Rizvi convey the suffering experienced by the local people throughout 250 years of occupation. The time of the Kalhora Dynasty (1701 to 1783) is known as the summit of success of Sindhi literature. The Kalhoras were indigenous people of Sindh. Mystic poets like Shah Abdul Latif Bhitai were the product of this period. The verse of Shah Abdul Latif Bhitai not only cast long shadows in social and political directions but also revolutionized the literacy taste and standard. Sachal Sarmast, Chain Rai Sami, Bachoo Mal Lund, Hamal Faqeer Laghari were poets of this period.

Though the British were non-native, soon after settling in Sindh they took up the task of formalizing Sindhi manuscript and soon succeeded. Sindhi language was standardized and official documents were published in it. This development gave an impetus to Sindhi literature by laying down the foundation for formal publication of Sindhi writing.

Creation of the Board
It was at this point that think-tanks in Sindh realized the dire need of an organisation which could initiate, supervise and promote the publication of material in Sindhi language. The Federal Advisory Board was created to fill the need in August 1940. In September 1950 a more powerful executive committee was constituted, and in March 1955 the Sindhi Adabi Board was brought into being.

Muhammad Ibrahim Joyo served as the first secretary of the Board. The Board was registered with the Assistant Registrar of the Joint Stock Committee in Khairpur.

Board of governors

Chairman
Makhdoom Jamil uz Zaman was the previous chairman from 4 June 2010 to 2011. He quit the Chairmanship due to his failure in resolving the appointment of the secretary of the board.

Present Chairman
As per Sindh Government Notification
present chairman is Makhdoom Saeed-u-Zaman

Present Secretary
 Mr. Allah Ditto Waghio (A.D, Vighio) Since July 01, 2011.

Chronological list of the chairmen of the board
 Mohammad Ayub Khuhro (Chief Minister Sindh), December 1951 – March 1955
 Allah Baksh Sarshar Uqaili, March 1955-September 1961
 Niaz Ahmed Commissioner Hyderabad Sindh, September 1961-November 1961
 Makhdoom Mohammad Zaman Talib-ul-mola, November 1961-July 1977
 Allama Ghulam Mustafa Qasmi, October 1977-January 1989
 Makhdoom Mohammad Zaman Talib-ul-mola, January 1989-April 1992
 Abdul Jabbar Junejo, March 1993-October 1994
 Hussain Shah Rashidi, October 1994-November 1996
 Abdul Hameed Akhoond (Acting), December 1996
 Muhammad Ibrahim Joyo, December 1996-July 2002
 Irfanullah Khan Marwat (Minister of Education), September 2003-June 2004
 Mazhar-ul-Haq Siddiqi (Acting), June 2004-July 2004
 Hamida Khuhro (Minister of Education), July 2004-June 2006
 Madad Ali Sindhi (Press Secretary to Chief Minister), June 2006–present

Founder
The Sindhi Adabi Board was founded 1951 and its founder was of national leader G. M. Syed who was then provincial education minister, constituted the Central Advisory Board for Sindhi Literature in August 1940 and appointed Miran Muhammad Shah as its first Chairman.

Translated books published in Sindhi
 Eastwick, Dry Leaves from Young Egypt, 1973

See also
 Sindhi literature
 Institute of Sindhology

References

External links
 Official website of Sindhi Adabi Board

Sindhi language
Sindhi literature
Government agencies  of Sindh